KXKL-FM (105.1 MHz, "KOOL 105") is a classic hits station serving the Denver metropolitan area. This station is licensed to Denver, Colorado and broadcasts with an ERP of 100 kW and is under ownership of Stan Kroenke's KSE Radio Ventures. Its studios are located on Colorado Boulevard in Glendale, and the transmitter is located on Mt. Morrison.

History

Middle of the road (1956-1973) 
The station began broadcasting in 1956 with the call letters KTGM with a MOR/Beautiful Music format, under the ownership of Good Music Associates. The station was acquired by Sound Corporation of Colorado in 1968, and changed call letters to KADX that same year.

Jazz (1973-1981) 
As KADX, the station had a MOR format that continued until it was sold to Columbine Broadcasting in 1973, who then flipped it to Jazz that same year. By 1978, it was sold again to Welcome Radio, but kept the Jazz format intact.

Country (1981-1987) 
By 1981, Great Empire Broadcasting added KADX to its portfolio, but would flip the station to Country in 1982 and take the call letters KBRQ, simulcasting its AM sister at 1280. During its tenure and through its numerous ownerships, the station, formats, signal, and its ratings, went unnoticed.

Oldies/classic hits (1987-present) 
On July 3, 1987, KBRQ would switch formats to Oldies as "KOOL 105", and changed call letters to KXKL. Shamrock Communications owned the station at the time of the flip. The format was also simulcast for the next 9 years on 1280 AM. After several ownership changes during the 1990s and 2000s, including Chancellor Media, AM/FM, and Infinity/CBS Radio, Wilks Broadcasting acquired the station in 2008, along with sister stations KIMN and KWOF. KXKL continues the Classic Hits format today, playing music from the 1970s, 1980s, 1990s, and early 2000s.

The radio station organizes the annual KOOL Concert, featuring live performances from artists from the genre.

On October 12, 2015, Kroenke Sports Enterprises, owned by Altitude Sports and Entertainment founder Stan Kroenke, announced they would acquire Wilks Broadcasting's Denver properties, including KXKL-FM, Country KWOF, and Hot AC KIMN. Once the sale was approved by the FCC, KSE was expected to flip one of the three outlets to Sports, which could see the Denver Nuggets, Colorado Avalanche, and Colorado Rapids moving from its current home in Denver, which is KKFN. The transaction was consummated on December 31, 2015, at a purchase price of $54 million. However, KXKL retained its Classic Hits format as KWOF made the flip to Sports on September 17, 2018.

References

 All Number One Radio.com website

External links

FCC history cards for KXKL

XKL-FM
Radio stations established in 1956
1956 establishments in Colorado
Kroenke Sports & Entertainment
Classic hits radio stations in the United States